Michael Hecht (born 27 April 1965) is a German former football player.

External links
 

1965 births
Living people
German footballers
TSV 1860 Munich players
SpVgg Unterhaching players
FC Bayern Munich II players
FC Augsburg players
Dynamo Dresden players
SpVgg Greuther Fürth players
2. Bundesliga players
Footballers from Munich
Association football defenders